EAM may refer to:

 East Art Map, an art history project
 Electric accounting machine
 Electro-absorption modulator
 Embedded atom model
 Emergency Action Message
 Enterprise architecture management
 Enterprise asset management
 European Academy of Microbiology
 Equine atypical myopathy
 External Affairs Minister
 External auditory meatus
 Henry Eam (died before 1360), Founder Knight of the Order of the Garter
 Najran Domestic Airport, in Saudi Arabia
 National Liberation Front (Greece), a Greek World War II Resistance movement